Church of the Holy Trinity is a historic Episcopal church located at 207 S. Church Street in Hertford, Perquimans County, North Carolina.  It was built between 1848 and 1851, and is a small, frame Gothic Revival style church. It has a deeply pitched gable roof, pointed arch door and window openings, and is sheathed in plain weatherboard. The front porch and corner bell tower were added in 1894.  Also on the property is a contributing church cemetery.

It was listed on the National Register of Historic Places in 1998.  It is located in the Hertford Historic District.

References

Episcopal church buildings in North Carolina
Churches on the National Register of Historic Places in North Carolina
Gothic Revival church buildings in North Carolina
Churches completed in 1850
19th-century Episcopal church buildings
Buildings and structures in Perquimans County, North Carolina
National Register of Historic Places in Perquimans County, North Carolina
Individually listed contributing properties to historic districts on the National Register in North Carolina